The Battle of Rogersville was a conflict in and around the town of Rogersville, Tennessee, on the morning of November 6, 1863, between the United States Army 3rd Brigade, 4th Cavalry Division and the Confederate States Army Jones' Brigade, 2nd Cavalry Brigade and the 8th Virginia Cavalry. Because Federal forces were caught largely by surprise, the Confederates, under Brigadier General William E. Jones, were able to recapture Rogersville along with significant supplies from the town's railroad storehouses.

Union casualties
Union casualties are reported in the following table. A note asserted that wounded soldiers were probably reported as captured. Another source stated that Battery M lost 4 men killed and 35 captured. All its guns were spiked and abandoned but 86 men, 50 horses, and some equipment avoided capture.

Notes

References

Battle Unit Details. (n.d.). Retrieved July 17, 2020, from https://www.nps.gov/civilwar/search-battle-units-detail.htm?battleUnitCode=UOH0007RC

Battles of the Western Theater of the American Civil War
Confederate victories of the American Civil War
Rogersville, Tennessee
Battles of the American Civil War in Tennessee
Conflicts in 1863
1863 in Tennessee
November 1863 events